Martin Pacek (born 28 April 1987 in Kristianstad) is a Swedish judoka. He weighs . He competed at the 2016 Summer Olympics in the men's 100 kg event, in which he was eliminated in the second round by Cho Gu-ham.

Personal life
Pacek's father Ryszard Pacek was a Polish Greco-Roman wrestler who emigrated to Sweden in the late 1970s. His younger brother Robin is also a judoka.

References

External links
 
 

1987 births
Living people
Swedish male judoka
Olympic judoka of Sweden
Judoka at the 2016 Summer Olympics
People from Kristianstad Municipality
Swedish people of Polish descent
European Games competitors for Sweden
Judoka at the 2015 European Games
Sportspeople from Skåne County
21st-century Swedish people